Průhonice is a municipality and village in Prague-West District in the Central Bohemian Region of the Czech Republic. It has about 2,600 inhabitants. It is known for Průhonice Park, which has been included in the UNESCO list of World Heritage Sites.

Administrative parts
The village of Rozkoš is an administrative part of Průhonice.

History
The first written mention of Průhonice is from 1187, when the Church of the Nativity of the Virgin Mary was consecrated.

Transport
The D1 motorway from Prague to Brno passes through Průhonice.

Sights
Průhonice Castle Park is one of the most significant castle parks in the Czech Republic. Since 2010, it has been protected as a national cultural monument. Later in 2010, it also has been included in the UNESCO list of World Heritage Sites (as part of Historic Centre of Prague). It is described as "original masterpiece of garden landscape architecture of worldwide importance". It was founded in 1885 by Count Arnošt Emanuel Silva Tarouca.

The Romanesque Church of the Nativity of the Virgin Mary is located in the park. It is the oldest preserved building in the municipality.

The Dendrological Garden was founded in the 1970s. There are about 5,000 taxa of woody plants and perennials, which makes it one of the largest collections of ornamental plants in the country.

Notable people
Andrej Babiš (born 1954), politician and businessman; lives here

References

External links

Průhonice Park and Castle official website

Villages in Prague-West District